Ernst Huber may refer to:

 Ernst Huber (fencer) (1902–?), Austrian Olympic fencer
 Ernst Huber (painter) (1895-1960), Austrian painter
 Ernst Huber (sport shooter) (1911–?), Swiss Olympic shooter
 Ernst Rudolf Huber (1903–1990), German jurist and constitutional historian